The rewrite man (rewrite person) is a newspaper reporter who works in the office, not on the street, taking information reported by others and crafting it into stories. It is rarely used as an actual title, however.  The term is something of a misnomer since rewrite men or women do not just "rewrite"; they take notes gathered by on-the-scene-reporters, information gathered by telephone, or information from wire services or clippings from other newspapers, and combine them as they write each article.  

The job has lost much of its importance due to technology that allows reporters to write and transmit articles from the field. In the pre-computer days of newspaper work, however, it was vital. At the most extreme example, reporters on deadline would telephone into the newsroom and dictate their notes to an editor – hence the movie cliché of reporters rushing to telephone booths and shouting "Get me rewrite!" into the phone.

Sometimes an entire front page, with bylines from several different reporters, will have actually been written by a single rewrite man working with an editor. 

Rewrite men are common at large national magazines, where reporters handle the reporting of the story while a writer takes the material and writes the actual article.  In this case, the reporter will put all the information and quotes gathered into a multipage file which is then given to the writer.  In cases of a story in several areas, several reporters will give their files to the writer.   Time magazine also used to engage rewrite men almost exclusively, although it has all but abandoned the practice as of its 2008 redesign.

References

Journalism occupations